Hilltops are the tops of Hills.

The word may also refer to:
 Hilltops Council, local government area in New South Wales
 Hilltops wine region, covering roughly the same area